Refugium, plural refugia, the Latin for "refuge" or "hideaway", may refer to:
 Refugium (fishkeeping), an appendage to a marine, brackish, or freshwater fish tank that shares the same water supply
 Refugium (population biology), a location of an isolated or relict population of a once widespread animal or plant species
 Last Glacial Maximum refugia specifically, in anthropology
 Refugium Range, a mountain range on Vancouver Island, British Columbia, Canada

See also
 Refuge (Buddhism)
 Refugium Peccatorum